Rain check may refer to:

General
Rain check (baseball), a ticket issued in case a baseball game is started but canceled due to rain prior to reaching the point of becoming official
Rain check (idiom), by analogy, a way to request rescheduling an invitation or an agreement for a merchant to provide to a customer an out-of-stock sale item at a later date

Entertainment

Literature
Rain Check (1946), a science-fiction novel by Lewis Padgett
Rain-Check (1956), a poem by Raymond Souster

Music
"Rain check", a song composed by Billy Strayhorn from the 1967 album ...And His Mother Called Him Bill, released by jazz legend Duke Ellington
"Rain Check" (1978), included on the jazz album Toshiko Plays Billy Strayhorn 
"Rain Check" (1990), included on the three-CD album The Blanton–Webster Band
"Rain Check" (1997), a song from the re-released album The Polyfuze Method Revisited by Kid Rock
"Rain Check" (2004), a song from the album Educated Guess by singer-songwriter Ani DiFranco
"Raincheck" (1971), backing side of a vinyl single by Trousers released by HappySad Records
"Raincheck" (1972), from the LP record Twice Upon a Rhyme by Paul Levinson
"Raincheck" (1995), from the album Days Like This by Irish singer-songwriter Van Morrison

See also
Check (disambiguation)